Funeshabad (also Romanized as Fūneshābād; also known as Fonūshābād, Panishabad, Pīshābād, and Qūneshābād) is a village in Abharrud Rural District of the Central District of Abhar County, Zanjan province, Iran. At the 2006 National Census, its population was 1,627 in 370 households. The following census in 2011 counted 1,740 people in 502 households. The latest census in 2016 showed a population of 1,762 people in 582 households; it was the largest village in its rural district.

References 

Abhar County

Populated places in Zanjan Province

Populated places in Abhar County